Albu Gulak (also Romanized as Ālbū Gūlak; also known as Al Bakūlak) is a village in Abshar Rural District, in the Central District of Shadegan County, Khuzestan Province, Iran. At the 2006 census, its population was 390, in 66 families.

References 

Populated places in Shadegan County